Post Momentary Affliction is the third studio album by Australian Christian extreme metal band Mortification, released in 1993. The album's sound has Mortification returning to their thrash metal roots, but with death metal elements still showing. It contains an alternate recording of the track "Impulsation" from the band's Break the Curse demo album. Post Momentary Affliction was bundled with Mortification's 1992 album Scrolls of the Megilloth on Nuclear Blast and included "Butchered Mutilation" as a bonus track, releasing on 18 November 1996. In 2008, a reissue was released by Metal Mind Productions, which also included "Butchered Mutilation" and three live tracks. Soundmass released reissues in 2020 and 2022, with the former having three live tracks and the latter having new remastering and two discs, with the second CD containing fifteen live tracks1; both reissues include "Butchered Mutilation". In 2010, HM Magazine ranked Post Momentary Affliction No. 70 on the Top 100 Christian metal albums of all-time list.

Recording 
Post Momentary Affliction was recorded at Toybox Studios in Northcote, Melbourne, Australia. Pre-production took place at Jamtim Studios in Cheltenham, Melbourne. The album was released on Intense Records and Nuclear Blast, with both versions having different cover artwork; the 2020 reissue contains both covers.

Track listing 

 Re-recorded song from Break the Curse

Personnel

Mortification
Steve Rowe – vocals, bass guitar
Michael Carlisle – guitar
Jayson Sherlock – drums

Additional musician
Doug Saunders – keyboards

Production
Mark Staiger – executive producer
Doug Saunders – producer, sound effects
Mark Tulk – assistant engineer
Doug Doyle – mastering at Digital Brothers in Costa Mesa, California

Additional personnel
Jayson Sherlock – cover artwork
Michael Carlisle – cover concept
Andrew "Surfie" Stuivenberg – photography
Scott Waters (Ultimatum) – design, layout (2020 and 2022 versions)
Paul D. Clifford – remastering at PCP Studios in Australia (2022 version)
Rob Colwell – live audio mastering at Bombworks Sound in McKinney, Texas (2022 version)
Patrick Wolf – live audio tracks (2022 version)

Notes
1. The 2022 reissue live tracks were recorded at Cornerstone Festival on 1 July 1994 in Bushnell, Illinois.

References

Mortification (band) albums
1993 albums